The Sanga Choeling Monastery, also spelt Sange Choeling Monastery (THL Sangngak Chö Ling), established in the 17th century by Lama Lhatsün Chempo, is one of the oldest monasteries in the Northeast Indian state of Sikkim. The literal meaning of Sanga Choeling is "Island of the Guhyamantra teachings", where gling means a vihara and "secret Mantra teachings" is a synonym for "Vajrayana Buddhism".

Pilgrimage to Sanga Choeling Monastery is undertaken by many Buddhist devotees as part of a religious and heritage circuit encompassing Pemayangtse Monastery, Rabdentse ruins, Khecheopalri Lake, Norbugang Chorten, Dubdi Monastery, Yuksom and Tashiding Monastery.

Architecture
Sanga Choeling Monastery, built in 1697, is also known as the place of secret spells. It has clay statues dating back to the 17th century. The monastery was affected by fire several times and was rebuilt. The Monastery's location provides very scenic and panoramic view all round.

Religiosity
On the tenth day of every month according to the Tibetan calendar, lamas recite hymns at this monastery. Every morning and evening prayers are special here. The monastery is reserved for men only and belongs to the Nyingma sect.

Gallery

References

External links
Coordinates of Sanga Choeling Monastery

Buddhist monasteries in Sikkim